Navira is a genus of spiders in the family Lycosidae. It was first described in 2009 by Piacentini & Grismado. , it contains only one species, Navira naguan, found in Argentina.

References

Lycosidae
Monotypic Araneomorphae genera
Spiders of Argentina